Anatrachyntis megacentra is a moth in the family Cosmopterigidae. It was described by Edward Meyrick in 1923, and is known from Fiji and the Cook islands

References

Moths described in 1923
Anatrachyntis
Moths of Fiji